Lisa Lundberg is a Swedish sprint canoer who competed in the early 1950s. She won a bronze medal in the K-2 500 m event at the 1950 ICF Canoe Sprint World Championships in Copenhagen. In 1946, she won the best athlete award in the Borlänge Idrottsallians municipality, nominated by the Borlänge Canoe Club.

References

Living people
Swedish female canoeists
Year of birth missing (living people)
ICF Canoe Sprint World Championships medalists in kayak